Jessica R. Asis (born on December 24, 1978), professionally known by the names DJ Laila, Laila Chikadora, and Laila Chikadora Pangilinan, is a radio DJ and TV personality in the Philippines.  She is currently a radio DJ of 92.3 News FM and an entertainment reporter of News5.

Filmography

TV shows

Radio shows
Gising Pilipinas (showbiz segment; DZMM Radyo Patrol 630)
Laugh-Out-Loud (DZMM Radyo Patrol 630)
Soundtrip (101.9 For Life! (now MOR 101.9 For Life!))
Sunday Big Time Pinoy (101.9 For Life! (now MOR 101.9 For Life!))
UKI Na! (Umagang Kay Ingay!) with Laila Chikadora (103.5 Wow FM (now 103.5 K-Lite))
ShowBisto with Tsongki Benj (Radyo5 92.3 News FM)
Night Chat with Tsongki Benj and Hans Mortel (Radyo5 92.3 News FM)
Morning Calls with Laila Chikadora (Radyo5 92.3 News FM)
Todo Bigay with Laila Chikadora and Shalala (Radyo5 92.3 News FM)
Good Vibes with Laila Chikadora and Stanley Chi (Radyo5 92.3 News FM)

External links
DJ Laila's blog site (inactive)

1978 births
Living people
Women DJs
Filipino radio personalities
Filipino television personalities
TV5 (Philippine TV network) personalities
News5 people
21st-century women musicians